Bénouville is a commune in the Seine-Maritime department in the Normandy region in northern France.

Geography

History
Just outside the village is the Bénouville road bridge over the Caen Canal. Since 6 July 1944, it is better known as Pegasus Bridge, the first objective to be captured in Operation Overlord.

Population

Places of interest
 The seventeenth century chateau.
 The church of St.Riquier, dating from the eleventh century.

See also
Communes of the Seine-Maritime department

References

External links

Communes of Seine-Maritime
Caletes

zh:贝努维尔 (卡尔瓦多斯省)